2008 World Masters Athletics Indoor Championships is the third in a series of World Masters Athletics Indoor Championships (also called World Masters Athletics Championships Indoor, or WMACi). This third edition took place in Clermont-Ferrand, France, from 17 to 22 March 2008.

The main venue was Jean-Pellez Stadium,

which has a banked indoor track where the turns are raised to neutralize the centrifugal force of athletes running the curves.
Supplemental venues included Clermont-Ferrand Sports Hall for opening ceremonies, Les Gravanches for Half Marathon and 10K Race Walk, and Stade Marcel-Michelin for Cross Country.

This Championships was organized by World Masters Athletics (WMA) in coordination with a Local Organising Committee (LOC): Annie Laurent, Jean Gracia.

The WMA is the global governing body of the sport of athletics for athletes 35 years of age or older, setting rules for masters athletics competition.

A full range of indoor track and field events were held.

In addition to indoor competition, non-stadia events included Half Marathon,

8K Cross Country,

10K Race Walk, Weight Throw, Hammer Throw, Discus Throw and Javelin Throw.

Results
Official results are partially archived at Masters2008.

Past Championships results are archived at WMA.

Additional archives are available from European Masters Athletics

as a searchable pdf,

from British Masters Athletic Federation

as a searchable pdf,

and from Masters Athletics

as a searchable pdf.

USATF Masters keeps a list of American world record holders.

Medal counts and other summaries are archived at the Clermont2008

and Masters2008 sites.

Several masters world records were set at this Indoor Championships. World records for 2008 are from WMA unless otherwise noted.

Women

Men

References

External links

French athletes
Australian athletes
Team USA results: Men, Women

World Masters Athletics Championships
World Masters Athletics Championships
International athletics competitions hosted by France
2008
Masters athletics (track and field) records